Vibhu (Sanskrit:विभु) means – 'mighty', 'powerful', 'eminent', 'supreme', 'able to', 'capable of', 'self-subdued', 'firm' or 'self-controlled'; in Nyaya philosophy, it means – 'eternal', 'existing everywhere', 'all-pervading', 'pervading all material things'. This word also refers to manas or mind. This word has its root in the term, bhū ( भू), meaning – 'become', 'arise', 'come into existence'; thus vibhu means – 'expand', 'become manifest', 'appear', 'pervade'.

Vedic significance
From Atharvaveda it is learnt that Sudhanvan Angirasa had three sons, Ribhu, Vibhu and Vaja, collectively known as Ribhus who were intelligent sages. They carried the luminous power of knowledge to this world, which knowledge pervaded the world as nectar. Ribhu or Ribhukshan was skillful at handling knowledge; Vibhu or Vibhawa was skillful in pervading and diffusing, and Vaja handled embodied plenitude with similar skill; all three dwelled in the solar-region and are considered to be the rays of the sun. They are the three leaders of rites and the possessors of opulence, and the three deities of several Rig Vedic hymns.

A mantra of the Rig Veda reads as follows:-

एकस्य चिन्मे विभ्वस्त्वोजो या नु दधृष्वान् कृणवै मनीषा |
अहं ह्युग्रो मरुतो विदानो यानि चयवमिन्द्र इदीश एषाम् || (Rig Veda I.165.10)

In the Rig Veda, the word, vibhu, means – 'all-pervading unified entity that permeates or extends throughout a spatial expanse', as is in the afore-cited mantra wherein the phrase - एकस्य चिन्मे विभ्वस्त्वोजः which means -  " Though I be but one, let my might be extensive. "  Though the words, vibhu and prabhu, appear in the Rig Veda but these words have a fixed psychological significance – vibhu means - 'coming into existence to pervade the whole being as ānanda, and prabhu means - 'coming into existence as a specific object or particular experience within the range of one’s consciousness'. A sage of the Rig Veda (II.xxiv.11) asserts that:-

विभु प्रभु प्रथमं मेहनावतो बृहस्पतेः सुविदत्राणि राध्या |
इमा सातानि वेन्यस्य वाजिनो येन जना उभ्यें भुञ्जते विशः ||

Brihaspati, the lord of the heaven of light and the guardian of rta, is present in all things and beings (vibhu) same as the Brahman of the Vedanta.

Philosophical significance
In the Kaushitaki Upanishad, while describing the world of Brahman, there is the mention of the hall of Brahman called Vibhu (or built by Vibhu here meaning – 'egoism') arriving at which hall the glory of Brahman reaches the one who seeks liberation, where the seeker thinks himself to be Brahman, and thinking thus approaches the throne Vikakshanā ('perception'), in other words, the seeker having become liberated experiences Brahman, his own true nature. Gaudapada in his kārikā on the Mandukya Upanishad stating:-

निवृत्तेः सर्वदुःखानामीशानः प्रभुरव्ययः  |
अद्वैतः सर्वभावानां देवस्तुर्यो विभु स्मृतः ||

describes the fourth state (turiya) as the ordainer (iśana), as the supreme lord (prabhu), as the non-dual (advaita) and the all-pervading (vibhu) god (devata) of all beings. Here, the word, avyaya, means that which is not subject to change; and turiya is vibhu because it pervades all the three states.

According to all six orthodox Vedic darśanas which comprise Hindu philosophy, with the exception of Ramanuja’s 'theory of atomic dimensionless soul', the ātmān is vibhu ('omnipresent'). The followers of Jainism, who believe that the ātmān assumes the size corresponding to the size of the body it occupies, also believe that in the final state of liberation it remains unalterable, but they reject the Hindu theory of vibhu which to them does not explain if the soul is same at all times everywhere why for is there the experience individual self. Vedāntists argue that for the atman to be unchangeable in the state of liberation then it must be regarded either as anu ('minute') or as vibhu ('pervasive'). The contention of the Yoga school that the jivatman and the paramatman are both mere consciousnesses and both are all-pervading (vibhu) and that moksha is merely the cessation of pain is also refuted – एतेन योगः प्रत्युक्तः (Brahma Sutras II.i.3).

Advaita Vedanta rests on the premise that only the substratum (Brahman) is real, the phenomenal world all with its properties and relations is unreal and due to maya. Substance, in its pure subtle state is the constitutive cause of things, and in its rational state it is the substratum of qualities, actions, etc., and exists in nine forms – earth (prithivi), water (jala), fire (agni), air (vayu), space (akasha) ('which five constitute the physical world'), direction (disha) ('without which no movement is not possible'), time (kaal) ('the substratum and the causal factor of all psycho-physical product and worldly behaviour'), mind (manas) and self (ātmān); the first four and mind are paramanus ('infinitesimal') and the rest are vibhu ('ubiquitous'), simple and infinite. Vindhyāvāsī, giving up the doctrine of the three psychical organs, associates the processes of the faculty of knowledge (buddhi) and I-consciousness with the thinking organ (manah) which three were the great all –penetrating vibhu. Vyasa too held mind (citta) to be all-penetrating (vibhu). Shankara explains that " the Self (Brahman), which is by nature all-pervasive (vibhu) assumes the form and qualities of the buddhi when apparently moving in the cycle of empirical existence. " Brahman, who is omnipresent (sarvagata), is without attributes; Brahman with attributes is Ishvara, who is vibhu possessing mahāmāyā, and who through his diverse powers creates all this diversity experienced through the senses.

References

Vedanta
Sanskrit words and phrases
Hindu philosophical concepts
Buddhist philosophical concepts
Yoga concepts